Mary Elizabeth Adams Brown (1842–1918) was an American writer, collector, and curator of musical instruments.

She is best known for her collection of musical instruments that she donated to the Metropolitan Museum of Art.
She worked together with her son, who made the drawings used to illustrate her catalog of instruments. Beginning in 1889, she gave instruments to The Metropolitan Museum of Art. The Crosby Brown Collection of Musical Instruments, named for her husband John Crosby Brown, became one of the world's most historic and comprehensive collections of musical instruments. It started with an impressive donation of 270 instruments mostly from the Far East, Middle East, Africa, and the Pacific Islands in 1889 that were accompanied with the stipulation that she and her son could add to the collection and replace items with items of equal importance but superior quality. By the time she died, the collection encompassed 5 gallery rooms and had 3600 pieces. By the time her son died it held 4000 pieces.

Notable European instruments

Notable works
 Musical instruments and their homes / by Mary E. Brown and Wm. Adams Brown ; with two hundred and seventy illustrations in pen and ink by Wm. Adams Brown. The whole forming a complete catalogue of the collection of musical instruments now in the possession of Mrs. J. Crosby Brown, digitized first 1888 copy of her catalog, presented prior to her gift, with 270 illustrations by her son
 Catalogue of the Crosby Brown collection of musicians' portraits, Biographical sketches by Brown, Mary Elizabeth, 1842–1918, Buffum, Clara, 1873–1938, 1904
 Alexander Brown and his descendants, 1764-1916, by Mary Elizabeth Brown, 1917

References

Sources
 1970's article about the collection with illustrations

External links
 

1842 births
1918 deaths
19th-century American women writers
American curators
American women curators
People associated with the Metropolitan Museum of Art
19th-century American writers
Collectors